Annette Mary Budgett Meakin (1867–1959) was a British travel author. She and her mother were the first English women to travel to Japan via the Trans-Siberian railway.

Life
Annette M. B. Meakin was born on 12 August 1867. Her parents were Edward Ebenezer and Sarah (née Budgett) Meakin. Her father worked as a tea planter in Almora in India.

She went to school in England and in Germany, studying music at the Royal College of Music, Kensington, and the Stern Conservatoire, Berlin, and classics at University College London (UCL). Her instructors at UCL included the classicist and poet A. E. Housman. Housman supplied a reference for her in 1900, commending her for enthusiasm "such as I have seldom known" and for her "zeal" at composing Latin prose and verse. The two continued to correspond until shortly before Housman's death in 1936. During World War I Meakin took the job of a chemist's assistant but writing was her career.

She and her mother, Sarah Meakin, were the first English women to travel to Japan on board the Trans-Siberian railway. They left London on January 1900 and they arrived in Russia on 21 May 1900 after delaying for a time in Paris. Annette noted that they had reduced their joint luggage to just three pieces. She wrote an account that was published the following year. Her book "A Ribbon of Iron" also described their stop-overs in Omsk, Tomsk, Krasnoyarsk and for a trip on the nearby Yenisei River which flows to the Arctic Ocean. Her book, "The Ribbon of Iron" was extensively quoted in the book of Harmon Tupper, "To the Great Ocean – Siberia and the Trans-Siberian Railway", published in London by Secker & Warburg in 1965.

She successfully sued another author for plagiarising her book on Galicia in 1921. In 1912 Catherine Gasquoine Hartley published The Story of Santiago de Compostela. Hartley and her publisher were successfully sued for plagiarism by Meakin. She showed that Hartley's book was too similar to her book Galicia, the Switzerland of Spain. As part of the settlement Hartley's book was removed from libraries.

Meakin died in 1959. She donated her papers to the Bodleian Library.

Selected works
A Ribbon Of Iron, 1901
In Russian Turkestan: A Garden of Asia, 1903
Russia Travels and Studies, 1906
Woman In Transition, 1907
Galicia, The Switzerland Of Spain, 1909
Hannah More, 1911
What America Is Doing, Letters From The New World, 1911
Enlistment Or Conscription?, 1914
Nausikaa, 1926/1938
Polyeuctes, 1929
Goethe and Schiller: 1785–1805 The Story of a Friendship in three volumes, 1932

References

External links
 

1867 births
1959 deaths
British travel writers
British women travel writers
Alumni of University College London